The 2022 TCR UK Touring Car Championship was the fifth season of the TCR UK Touring Car Championship. The championship featured production-based touring cars built to TCR specifications and was held over fifteen races across seven meetings throughout England. The championship was operated by Stewart Lines' Maximum Group.

Calendar
A new calendar was announced commencing on 16 April 2022 with 15 rounds scheduled.

Teams and drivers

Driver Changes 
Entering/Re-Entering TCR UK
 Scott Sumpton joined Essex & Kent Motorsport driving a Hyundai i30 N TCR.
 Former Renault Clio Cup UK and Mini Challenge UK champion Ant Whorton-Eales would enter a Subaru WRX STI TCR with JamSport Racing.
 Former Volkswagen Racing Cup competitor Simon Tomlinson also joined JamSport Racing driving a Cupra León TCR.
 Another driver to join JamSport Racing would be former Ginetta GT4 Supercup racer Adam Shepherd driving a Hyundai i30 N TCR.
 Having entered sporadically in 2021, Andy Wilmot would join for the full season in another JamSport Racing run Hyundai i30 N TCR.
 Callum Newsham, the son of former BTCC race winner Dave Newsham, would race for Power Maxed Racing alongside former Volkswagen Racing Cup driver Russell Joyce, with both driving Cupra León TCR's. 
 Having entered a single round in 2021, Chris Wallis was announced for a full season campaign with Power Maxed Racing in a Hyundai i30 N TCR.
 Mini Challenge UK race winner Brad Hutchinson joined the grid driving a family run Audi RS 3 LMS TCR.
 Aston Martin Cognizant F1 Team driver ambassador Jessica Hawkins would drive an Area Motorsport run Cupra León TCR alongside Miltek Civic Cup race winner Jamie Tonks.
 Former BTCC race winner Chris Smiley entered the season with Restart Racing in a Honda Civic Type R TCR (FK8).
 Hugo Cook announced his return, after a late season entry in 2021, in his family run Audi RS 3 LMS TCR.
 Another driver graduating from the Volkswagen Racing Cup was Matthew Wilson who would debut with JWB Motorsport in a brand new Cupra León Competición TCR. He would be joined at the opening round by Kieran Griffin and Miltek Civic Cup front runner, Rob Butler, both driving a Volkswagen Golf GTI TCR.
 Having entered the second half of the 2021 season, Jack Depper announced a return for the full campaign driving for Capture Motorsport in a Volkswagen Golf GTI TCR.
 Steve Gales entered the championship for the first time. He was initially slated to run a Volkswagen Golf GTI TCR but would arrive at the first round with an Audi RS 3 LMS TCR.
 Darelle Wilson would enter the full season with his family run Vauxhall Astra TCR. He would remain one of only 2 drivers to appear in every season of TCR UK.
 Teenager Alex Ley was announced for a late season entry driving a Daniel James Motorsport run Hyundai i30 N TCR.
 Having entered the final event in 2021, Isaac Smith joined for the full season in a family run Volkswagen Golf GTI TCR.

Changed Teams
 With Motus One Racing leaving the championship, Max Hart joined JamSport Racing driving a Hyundai i30 N TCR.

Leaving TCR UK
 2 of Power Maxed Racing's 2021 entries, Dan Kirby and William Butler, failed to return.
 Having entered the opening rounds in 2021, Motus One Managing Director Will Powell left to race in the BTCC. His teammate at Motus One, Danny Krywyj also failed to return.
 Having done selected events in 2021, Alex Morgan, Alex Kite, Tom Hibbert, Jamie Sturges, Toby Bearne and Daniel Wylie all did not return.

Team Changes 
 Essex & Kent Motorsport expanded to 3 cars with defending double champion Lewis Kent switching to a Hyundai Veloster N TCR.
 Area Motorsport would expand to 3 Cupra León TCR's.

Mid-Season Changes 
 Simon Tomlinson & Kieran Griffin left the series after the opening round.
 Neil Trotter and Chameleon Motorsport would enter the championship from the second round onwards with a Cupra León TCR.
 Rob Butler would switch to Garage 81 for the second round. He would leave the series before the third event, returning to the Miltek Civic Cup.
 Alex Ley entered the season earlier than announced, appearing from the second round onwards.
 Having appeared in 2 rounds during 2021, Mark Smith returned for both Donington Park meetings with his Cupra León TCR being run under the Richmond Fire Motorsport banner.
 Hugo Cook left the series after round 2.
 Callum Newsham missed the second round due to illness.
 Jack Depper would leave the series after the third round.
 Prior to round 4, Adam Shepherd left JamSport Racing and joined Area Motorsport.
 Both Russell Joyce and Chris Wallis missed round 4 and 5 before both returned for round 6.
 Darron Lewis and George Heler would join the grid for round 6. Lewis would run his Audi RS 3 LMS TCR for his own team while Heler's Volkswagen Golf GTI TCR would be run by Paul Sheard Racing. However, both entries were unable to score points.
 Steve Gales' entry changed several times during the season. For the opening round his Audi RS 3 LMS TCR was run under the Playerlands banner. For rounds 2 & 3 he was entered under the Welch Motorsport banner. He missed round 4 due to damage sustained at the previous round before returning for round 5. This time he would drive a Volkswagen Golf GTI TCR for MPHR. For the final two events, MPHR would continue to run him but he returned to driving an Audi RS 3 LMS TCR.
 Ahead of the final event, both Andy Wilmot and Max Hart announced that they would be leaving JamSport Racing.
 For the season finale, Chameleon Motorsport upgraded and expanded to two Cupra León Competición TCR's for Neil Trotter and Mini Challenge UK racer Lewis Brown.
 Prior to the final round, Area Motorsport announced on social media that Bruce Winfield would switch to a Hyundai i30 N TCR. He would be joined by fellow Hyundai drivers Alex Ley and Andy Wilmot who left Daniel James Motorsport and JamSport Racing respectively.
 For the final 2 races, Jonathon Beeson would race the Paul Sheard Racing Volkswagen Golf GTI TCR.
 For the last 2 races, George Jaxon would race a Team HARD. Cupra León TCR. This was the car run previously by Area Motorsport for Jamie Tonks. 
 Area Motorsport with FastR teammates Jessica Hawkins and Jamie Tonks would both miss the final round with both cars being sold beforehand.
 Ant Whorton-Eales would also miss the final event leaving JamSport Racing with 0 entries having started the season with 5.

Race calendar and results

Championship standings

Drivers' Standings

Drivers' top 13 results from the 15 races count towards the championship. Drivers cannot drop scores from the final 2 races at Snetterton.

Goodyear Diamond Trophy Standings

Notes

References

External links
 

UK
TCR UK